Genevieve Clay-Smith (born 1988) is an Australian writer and director. She is an advocate of inclusive filmmaking.

Clay-Smith's career as a writer and a film director began in 2009 when her film, starring a man with Down syndrome, won Australia's largest short film festival, Tropfest. She is the co-founder and Chief Executive Officer (CEO) of the not-for-profit organisation Bus Stop Films (BSF) and co-founder and Creative Director of the creative agency, Taste Creative.

Early life
Clay-Smith grew up in Newcastle and attended the Hunter School of the Performing Arts in Broadmeadow. As an actress in the local children's theatre called the 'Young People's Theatre,’ she was cast as Nancy Cakebread in the Australian feature film, 15 Almore (1998).

Clay-Smith graduated with a Bachelor of Arts (BA) Degree, majoring in Media Arts and Production/ Mass Communication, from the University of Technology Sydney in 2008. She was then accepted into the Australian Film, Television and Radio School (AFTRS) where she completed her Masters of Screen Arts in 2013.

She is an alumnus of the Foundation for Young Australians, Young Social Pioneers (YSP) program, where she received a 12-month scholarship to be mentored and trained in social entrepreneurship in 2010.

Early career

Clay-Smith developed an interest in representing disability on screen when she was employed to make a feature-length documentary for Down Syndrome New South Wales in 2007. In 2009, at the age of 20, she won the Best Film award at Tropfest, with a short film named 'Be My Brother.' The film starred a man with Down syndrome and was created with the support of various crew members with disabilities, who worked with and learnt from professional crew members on set.

Clay-Smith was the director of Beyond Vision from 2010 – 2011, NSW only blind acting ensemble held at the Power House Youth Theatre in Fairfield, New South Wales.

Career

In 2009 Clay-Smith co-founded the not for profit organisation Bus Stop Films, and she co-founded Taste Creative in 2010. She has been forging pathways for inclusion in the film industry. She has campaigned for the need to incorporate more inclusion and diversity on the film screen and within the media. She has forged a partnership between BSF and AFTRS, facilitating Bus Stop's students with intellectual disabilities access to the film, television and radio industries.

Clay-Smith was a stakeholder and consultant of the 2017 Screen NSW ScreenAbility initiative. She received an AMP Tomorrow Makers grant in 2016 which enabled her to spend 18 months writing Bus Stop Films' Accessible Film Studies Curriculum and turning it into an online resource.

In 2016, Clay-Smith was invited by the NSW Minister for the Arts to join the Arts and Culture Advisory Board Committee, to advise the government and help influence policy on matters pertaining to developing and promoting the arts and culture of NSW.  

Clay-Smith has given presentations at the BBC Manchester, the Extraordinary Film Festival in Belgium, Walt Disney Animation Studios HQ in Burbank and the Scottish Mental Health Arts and Film Festival. In January 2018, she finished her first international project in Japan, titled 'Shakespeare in Tokyo', which combined a workshop and professional work experience for six Japanese people with Down syndrome. Shakespeare in Tokyo was launched at the international film festival Short Shorts Film Festival with the Governor of Tokyo Yuriko Koike.

In March 2018, Clay-Smith was invited to deliver the closing keynote speech at the Toronto International Film Festival – Kids section, where she presented on BSF and the power of inclusive filmmaking.  

Clay-Smith released her children's book I Didn't Like Hubert in 2018, with all proceeds being donated to the Humpty Dumpty Foundation.

Awards and recognition
Clay-Smith won the award of Young Australian Filmmaker at the 2014 Byron Bay International Film Festival for the film The Interviewer. She was the 2014 winner of the Australian Financial Review and Westpac 100 Women of Influence Award, where she was recognised as the overall winner in the Young Leader category for her contribution to creating inclusion within the film industry.

In 2015, Clay-Smith was named the NSW Young Australian of the Year.

In 2017, she was the winner of the Entrepreneurial Award in the B&T 30 under 30 awards.  In the same year, she was awarded the Sidney Myer Creative Fellowship to support her professional work. This is an award of  given to mid-career creatives and thought leaders.

In 2018, Clay-Smith and her husband Henry Smith accepted the Optus My Business Award as Taste Creative won the Media, Marketing & Advertising Business of the Year award.

Filmography

Awards & nominations

References

External links 

 
 Awards for Genevieve Clay-Smith on IMDb

1988 births
Living people
People from Newcastle, New South Wales
Australian writers
Australian film directors
Australian women film directors